The Provincial Women's Hockey League (or PWHL) is a Junior women's ice hockey league in Ontario, Canada that was founded in 2004. It is considered to be the highest level of junior women's amateur ice hockey in Ontario, and is sanctioned by Hockey Canada and the Ontario Women's Hockey Association.

The PWHL provides alumni to the Canadian Interuniversity Sport, National Collegiate Athletic Association, the Professional National Women's Hockey League, as well as the Canada women's national ice hockey team.

History

The PWHL was founded in 2004 by the Ontario Women's Hockey Association.  The PWHL is the women's equivalent to men's junior hockey, but is classified by the OWHA as Intermediate AA officially as the OWHA does not have an official "junior" classification system.  Despite this, the teams of the PWHL market themselves as women's junior hockey.

One of the league's most notable alumni is Meghan Agosta who played for the Windsor Wildcats.  She went on to play professional with the Montreal Stars of the Canadian Women's Hockey League and is a member of two Olympic championship teams.

In the early years of the league, when PWHL teams had to compete for OWHA provincials they would do so with representatives of the Ottawa District.  The PWHL franchises proved much more competitive than their Ottawa counterparts and after two seasons Ottawa applied to and joined the PWHL.  By the 2009 league playoffs, the Ottawa Senators beat the league powerhouse Toronto Jr. Aeros to win its first league championship.

The most dominant franchise in league history is the Toronto Jr. Aeros.  The Aeros have won five league championships, including the first three consecutively, two Silver Medal finishes and a single Bronze medal finish in league playdowns.  The Aeros have also won five regular season championships.  Additionally, the Aeros have won three Golds at provincials, as well as two silvers and a bronze.  The Aeros have also twice accomplished the PWHL's "triple crown" winning the regular season title, playoff championship, and provincial championship all in one year in both 2005 and 2006.

In 2019-2020, the Etobicoke Dolphins finished the regular season in first place.  Eight teams advanced to the quarter-final round of the playoffs: Etobicoke, Cambridge, Burlington, Kingston, Stoney Creek, Oakville, Toronto and Ottawa. Due to the 2020 Coronavirus pandemic, the remainder of the playoffs were cancelled.

Teams

Defunct franchises
Chatham Outlaws (2004-2006)
Hamilton Hawks (2004-2011)
Markham-Stouffville Stars (2004-2009)

Alumni Cup Playoff Champions
The winner of the final four is awarded the Alumni Cup.

Provincials
The OWHA runs a second run of playoffs that determines Provincial champion.  These are not operated by the PWHL, but have all PWHL teams participating.

National team and professional alumni

The following PWHL alumni have represented Canada in international tournaments and in Professional leagues.

Meghan Agosta (Windsor Wildcats), 2006, 2010, 2014, 2018 Winter Games
Courtney Birchard (Toronto Jr. Aeros)
Mellissa Channell (Burlington Jr. Barracudas)
Mallory Deluce (Bluewater Jr. Hawks)
Laura Fortino (Stoney Creek Jr. Sabres) 2014, 2018 Winter Games
Brittany Haverstock (Stoney Creek Jr. Sabres)
Haley Irwin (Toronto Jr. Aeros) 2010, 2014, 2018 Winter Games
Laura McIntosh (Mississauga Jr. Chiefs) Canada Under-22/Development Team
Stefanie McKeough (Ottawa Senators)
Isabel Menard (Ottawa Senators)
Jamie Miller (Toronto Jr. Aeros)
Carolyne Prevost (London Jr. Devilettes), Canada women's national under-18 ice hockey team
Ashley Riggs (Durham West Jr. Lightning)
Jillian Saulnier (Toronto Jr. Aeros) 2018 Winter Games
Britni Smith (Markham-Stouffville Stars)
Natalie Spooner (Durham West Jr. Lightning) 2014, 2018 Winter Games
Jennifer Wakefield (Durham West Jr. Lightning) 2010, 2014 Winter Games
Tara Watchorn (Durham West Jr. Lightning) 2014 Winter Games
Catherine White (Mississauga Jr. Chiefs)
Jessica Wong (Stoney Creek Jr. Sabres)
Celine Frappier (Southwest Wildcats/Toronto Jr. Aeros)

Awards

Regular Season champions

Scoring champion

Goaltending Award

Coach of the Year

Christie Rose Scholarship

For ten years, the PWHL awarded a scholarship in memory of former PWHL player Christie Rose. She was an 18-year-old young woman who died on June 24, 2008, as a result of her injuries suffered in a car accident. The scholarship is awarded on an annual basis to recognize a young woman who shares the same qualities and characteristics as Christie. The scholarship program was ended after it awarded its tenth recipient.

Recipients

References

External links
 Provincial Women's Hockey League Website
 Ontario Womens Hockey Association Website

4
Ice hockey leagues in Ontario
Amateur ice hockey